The climate of Gwadar is located at – meters above sea level and features a dry and hot arid climate. The oceanic influence keeps the temperature lower than that in the summer and higher in winter. The uniformity of temperature is a unique characteristic of the coastal region in Balochistan. Occasionally, winds moving down the Balochistan plateau bring cold spells, otherwise the winter is pleasant. In Gwadar, winter is shorter than summer. Gwadar's weather is identical to that of the Middle East as most rain occurs from December till January.

Factors
Gwadar being near the Arabian peninsula has hot and dry weather almost all-year round. The following are the main factors that influence the weather over Gwadar.
Western Disturbances generally occur during the summer months and cause moderate to above-moderate rainfall, temperatures also decrease due to it.
Shamal winds mostly occur during the months of April till May, these winds are quite dusty and are stronger in the morning than at night.
Continental air prevails during the period when there is no precipitation in the city.

Monthly weather conditions
The following is the monthly summary of climatic conditions in Gwadar.

January
January is the coldest month of the city with the lowest temperature of  recorded on 31 January 2001 while the highest temperature was  recorded on 30 January 1963. Western Disturbance plays a vital role in the weather of Gwadar as most winter rains are dumped by it. Gwadar being close to the border of Iran gets moderate to above moderate rain during this month as Western disturbances are strong near the western borders of Pakistan.

February
February is also very chilly in the city with the lowest temperature of  recorded on 1 February 2001 while the highest temperature was  recorded on 27 February 2008. Moderate intensity rains also occur during this month.

March
Hot and dry weather is main factor of this month with highest temperature of  recorded on 29 March 1999, while lowest temperature of  recorded on 4 March 2003.

April
Again, hot and dry weather hovers over the city with a slight increase in temperature.

May
The weather in May is identical to that of April. The heat wave is the main factor of this month. There is no rain during this month but drizzles may occur rarely.

June

June is the hottest month of Gwadar city. Rains do not occur during this month. If a tropical cyclone that forms in the Arabian sea approaches Gwadar, then light rains may occur as these cyclones get weak by the time they reach Gwadar. Cyclone Gonu moved past Gwadar with light rain but brought strong winds in early June 2007. Phet's rainfall also made the record for highest monthly rainfall in Gwadar as the average is only .

July
July is identical to June, the weather remains hot and humid. The highest temperature was  recorded on 14 July 1987 while the lowest temperature was  recorded on 12 July 2001. Drizzles may occur during this month.

August
There is no change in the weather of Gwadar in August as it remains hot and humid but temperatures decrease a little bit. The highest temperature was  recorded on 11 August 1962 while the lowest temperature was  recorded on 4 August 1999. Drizzles may occur in this month, too.

September
September is hotter but less humid than August. But temperatures rise in this month. The highest temperature was  recorded on 11 September 1962 while the lowest temperature was  recorded on 26 September 2004. Trace amounts of drizzle may occur in this month.

October

October is the driest month of the city and it is the month in which autumn visits the city. The highest temperature was  recorded on 1 October 1999 while the lowest temperature was  recorded on 23 October 1975. Drizzles may occur in this month.

November
The first week of November is hot while the rest is mild with dry weather. The highest temperature was  recorded on 1 November 1965 while the lowest temperature was  recorded on 27 November 2003. Winter rain showers occur in this month due to Western disturbances.

December
December is the month in which the cold wave hits the city because Gwadar is close to the sea, making December a mild month. Western disturbances cause heavy showers in this month that decrease the temperature. The highest temperature was  recorded on 8 December 2005 while the lowest temperature was  recorded on 15 December 2003. Heavy downpours occur in this month.

List of Cyclones that effected Gwadar and the Makran Coast

Cyclones that form in the Arabian Sea do not make a landfall in Gwadar since the city is located on the extreme western coast of Pakistan. The following are the cyclones that affected Gwadar city;

In 1895, a cyclonic storm hit the Makran coast.
In June 1948, a tropical storm made landfall along the Makran coast.
In June 2007, a category-5 Cyclone Gonu (the strongest cyclone in the Arabian Sea) passed near the city as a cyclonic storm with lashing rains and high winds.
On 26 June 2007, Cyclonic storm Cyclone Yemyin made landfall in the Balochistan coast as a high-end tropical storm.
In June 2010, category-4 Cyclone Phet (the 2nd strongest cyclone in the Arabian Sea) passed near Gwadar as a strong category-1 Cyclone. Phet battered the city with record-breaking rains and strong windstorms.

Annual rainfall of Gwadar

The following are the annual rainfall for the last few years based on data from the Pakistan Meteorological Department.
In 2008, more than  rainfall was recorded.
In 2009, a total of  rainfall was recorded.
In 2010, a total of  rainfall was recorded.
In 2011, a total of  rainfall was recorded as of 7 October 2011.

See also
 Climate of Pakistan
 Climate of Quetta
 Pakistan Meteorological Department
 List of extreme weather records in Pakistan
 2011 Balochistan floods

References

External links
 Pakistan Meteorological Department

Gwadar
Gwadar District